Jericho Eduard Sims (born October 20, 1998) is an American professional basketball player for the New York Knicks of the National Basketball Association (NBA). He played college basketball for the Texas Longhorns.

High school career
Sims attended Cristo Rey Jesuit High School in Minneapolis, Minnesota. In his junior season, he averaged 21.8 points, 11.2 rebounds and 3.7 assists per game. As a senior, he averaged 25 points and 10 rebounds per game. Sims left as Cristo Rey Jesuit's all-time leading scorer, with 2,005 points. A consensus four-star recruit, he committed to playing college basketball for Texas, choosing the Longhorns over Minnesota.

College career
As a freshman at Texas, Sims averaged five points and 3.9 rebounds per game. He assumed a more important role late in the season after an injury to Mohamed Bamba. He averaged 4.2 points and 3.6 rebounds per game as a sophomore while missing time with an ankle injury. Sims' junior season was cut short by a stress fracture in his back against Baylor on February 10, 2020. As a junior, he averaged 9.7 points, 8.2 rebounds and 1.2 blocks per game, earning All-Big 12 Honorable Mention. On March 13, 2021, Sims posted 21 points and 14 rebounds in a 91–86 win over Oklahoma State at the Big 12 tournament title game. He averaged 9.2 points, 7.2 rebounds and 1.1 blocks per game as a senior, receiving All-Big 12 Honorable Mention. Following the season, he declared for the 2021 NBA draft while maintaining his college eligibility. He later signed with Klutch Sports, forgoing his remaining eligibility.

Professional career

New York Knicks (2021–present) 
Sims was selected in the second round of the 2021 NBA draft with the 58th pick by the New York Knicks. On August 8, 2021, he signed a two-way contract with New York, splitting time with their G League affiliate, the Westchester Knicks. On July 9, 2022, Sims signed a three-year, partially guaranteed contract with the Knicks.

In February 2023, Sims was selected to replace Portland Trail Blazers rookie Shaedon Sharpe in the Slam Dunk Contest at the 2023 NBA All-Star Game. Sims did not make it past the first round.

Career statistics

NBA

|-
| style="text-align:left;"| 
| style="text-align:left;"| New York
| 41 || 5 || 13.5 || .722 || – || .414 || 4.1 || .5 || .3 || .5 || 2.2
|- class="sortbottom"
| style="text-align:center;" colspan="2"| Career
| 41 || 5 || 13.5 || .722 || – || .414 || 4.1 || .5 || .3 || .5 || 2.2

College

|-
| style="text-align:left;"| 2017–18
| style="text-align:left;"| Texas
| 34 || 11 || 18.5 || .607 || .000 || .426 || 3.9 || .2 || .3 || .5 || 5.0
|-
| style="text-align:left;"| 2018–19 
| style="text-align:left;"| Texas
| 35 || 16 || 14.9 || .569 || – || .600 || 3.6 || .2 || .2 || .5 || 4.2
|-
| style="text-align:left;"| 2019–20 
| style="text-align:left;"| Texas 
| 24 || 24 || 27.3 || .658 || – || .592 || 8.2 || .8 || .4 || 1.2 || 9.7
|-
| style="text-align:left;"| 2020–21
| style="text-align:left;"| Texas
| 26 || 26 || 24.5 || .696 || – || .520 || 7.2 || .7 || .7 || 1.1 || 9.2
|- class="sortbottom"
| style="text-align:center;" colspan="2"| Career
| 119 || 77 || 20.5 || .639 || .000 || .524 || 5.4 || .4 || .4 || .8 || 6.6

Personal life
Sims' father, Charles, played college basketball for Minnesota before becoming a dentist. Two of his brothers also played NCAA Division I basketball: Ty at Kansas State and Jason at Northern Iowa. Another brother, Dominique, played college football for Minnesota.

References

External links
Texas Longhorns bio

1998 births
Living people
American men's basketball players
Basketball players from Minneapolis
Centers (basketball)
New York Knicks draft picks
New York Knicks players
Texas Longhorns men's basketball players
Westchester Knicks players